The Tilden Prize is an award that is made by the Royal Society of Chemistry for advances in chemistry. The award was established in 1939 and commemorates Sir William A. Tilden, a prominent British chemist. The prize runs annually with up to three prizes available. Winners receive £5000, a medal and certificate.

Recipients  
Recipients of the award, given since 1939, include:

 2021 – 
 2020 – Christiane Timmel, Stephen Liddle, Jianliang Xiao
 2019 – Russell E. Morris, Eric Mcinnes, James Naismith
 2018 – , Jonathan Clayden, 
 2017 – Jas Pal Badyal, Lucy Carpenter, Neil McKeown
 2016 – Véronique Gouverneur, 
 2015 – , Leroy Cronin, David J. Wales
 2014 – Andrew Ian Cooper, Guy Lloyd-Jones, Iain McCulloch
 2013 – Steven Armes, Eleanor Campbell, 
 2012 – Harry Anderson, James R. Durrant, 
 2011 – Jeremy Hutson, John Sutherland, Richard Winpenny
 2010 – , David Leigh, 
 Tilden Lectureship 2009/2010 – , Peter Bruce, 
 2009 – Andrew Orr-Ewing, Christopher Hunter
 2008 – Varinder Aggarwal, 
 2007 – , David Logan, 
 2006 – , John M.C. Plane, Matthew Rosseinsky
 2005 – , Richard G. Compton, David W. Knight
 2003 – Andrew Holmes, David Parker, 
 2002 – Anthony P. Davis, John Goodby, Peter Anthony Tasker
 2001 – Lynn Gladden, Martin Schröder, Thomas J. Simpson
 1998 – Geoffrey Cloke, Dominic Tildesley, 
 1997 – David Clary, Stephen G. Davies, David E. Fenton
 1996 – Michael Ashfold, James Feast, 
 1995 – Jeremy K. Burdett, Anthony J. Stace, 
 1994 – Anthony Barrett, Robert J. Donovan, John Evans
 1993 – Peter Edwards, Paul Madden, Douglas W. Young
 1992 – , Philip Kocienski, Robin Perutz
 1991 – Graham Fleming, 
 1990 – John M. Brown, Martyn Poliakoff, Robert K. Thomas
 1989 – , Michael Mingos, Jim Staunton
 1988 – Brian F. G. Johnson, David Anthony King, Stephen V. Ley
 1987 – , Anthony Kirby, Kenneth Wade
 1986 – Mark Child, Brian T. Heaton, 
 1985 – David Garner, Ronald Grigg, J H Pritchard
 1984 – David Thomas Clark, 
 1983 – Robin Clark, Ian William Murison Smith, Dudley Howard Williams
 1982 – C. Robin Ganellin, Malcolm Green, John Philip Simons
 1981 – Harold Kroto, Andrew Pelter
 1980 – Edward W. Abel, Ian Fleming, 
 1979 – John Albery, Jack Baldwin, Peter Maitlis
 1978 – James K. Sutherland, 
 1977 – , Karl Howard Overton
 1976 – Richard Norman, 
 1975 – Alan R. Katritzky, John White
 1974 – , Bernard L. Shaw
 1973 – Charles Wayne Rees, John Meurig Thomas
 1972 – Alan Carrington, Michael F. Lappert
 1971 – John Cadogan, F. Gordon A. Stone
 1970 – Leslie Crombie,  
 1969 – , Robert Williams
 1968 – Robert Haszeldine, David W. Turner
 1967 – , Jack Lewis
 1966 – Norman Greenwood, Basil Weedon
 1965 – Brian Thrush, Mark C. Whiting
 1964 – A. David Buckingham, Franz Sondheimer
 1963 – , Aubrey Trotman-Dickenson
 1962 – Alan Battersby, Rex Richards
 1961 – Joseph Chatt, 
 1960 – Ronald Nyholm, Ralph Raphael
 1959 – Charles Kemball, Peter Pauson
 1958 – James Baddiley, George Porter
 1957 – Richard Maling Barrer, Basil Lythgoe
 1956 – , 
 1955 – Douglas Hugh Everett, George Wallace Kenner
 1954 – Michael J. S. Dewar, Christopher Longuet-Higgins
 1953 – John Stuart Anderson, 
 1952 – Derek Barton, 
 1951 – Charles Coulson, Donald Holroyde Hey
 1950 – Frederick Dainton, Francis Leslie Rose
 1949 – Meredith Gwynne Evans, Frank Stuart Spring
 1948 – C. E. H. Bawn, 
 1947 – Ernest Gordon Cox, Ewart Jones
 1946 – Albert Ernest Alexander, Maurice Stacey
 1945 – Edward David Hughes, 
 1944 – Wilson Baker, John Monteath Robertson
 1943 – Frederick George Mann, Harold Warris Thompson
 1942 – Ronald P. Bell, John Masson Gulland
 1941 – Harry Julius Emeléus, Robert Downs Haworth
 1940 – Harry Melville, Alexander R. Todd
 1939 – Edmund Hirst,

See also

 List of chemistry awards

References 

Awards of the Royal Society of Chemistry
Awards established in 1939